Fluxus is a live coding environment for 3D graphics, music and games. It uses the programming language Racket (a dialect of Scheme/Lisp) to work with a games engine with built-in 3D graphics, physics simulation and sound synthesis.  All programming is done on-the-fly, where the code editor appears on top of the graphics that the code is generating.  It is an important reference for research and practice in exploratory programming, pedagogy, live performance and games programming.

References

Digital art
Computer programming
Live coding
Algorave